The Beijing Administration Institute, also known as the CPC Beijing Municipal Party Committee School, is a tertiary institution of learning in the Xicheng District of Beijing, China.

It is located at 6 Chegongzhuang Street (Chēgōngzhuāng dàjiē 6 hào).

Zhalan Cemetery

The college campus includes the Zhalan Cemetery which houses the remains of many of the most prominent members of the Jesuit China missions, including Matteo Ricci, Ferdinand Verbiest, and Johann Adam Schall von Bell. Since the cemetery is inside the campus, it is not open to the public.

References

External links
 

Schools in Beijing